Rottboellia (commonly called itch grass) is a genus of African, Asian, and Australian plants in the grass family.

The genus was named in honour of Danish botanist Christen Friis Rottbøll (1727-1797).

 Species
 Rottboellia cochinchinensis (Lour.) Clayton - Africa, Asia, Australia
 Rottboellia coelorachis G.Forst. - New Caledonia, Vanuatu
 Rottboellia goalparensis Bor - Assam
 Rottboellia laevispica Keng - Anhui, Jiangsu
 Rottboellia paradoxa de Koning & Sosef - Philippines
 Rottboellia purpurascens Robyns - tropical Africa

 Formerly included
Numerous species now considered better suited to other genera: Chasmopodium, Coelorachis, Elionurus, Eremochloa, Glyphochloa, Hainardia, Hemarthria, Henrardia, Heteropholis, Ischaemum, Lasiurus, Lolium, Loxodera, Manisuris, Mnesithea, Muhlenbergia, Ophiuros, Oropetium, Parapholis, Phacelurus, Pholiurus, Psilurus, Ratzeburgia, Rhytachne, Schizachyrium, Spartina, Stenotaphrum, Thaumastochloa, Urelytrum and Xerochloa.

References

External links
 Grassbase - The World Online Grass Flora

Andropogoneae
Poaceae genera
Grasses of Africa
Grasses of Asia
Grasses of Oceania